Each "article" in this category is a collection of entries about several stamp issuers, presented in alphabetical order. The entries themselves are formulated on the micro model and so provide summary information about all known issuers.

See the :Category:Compendium of postage stamp issuers page for details of the project.

BA/BMA Issues 

Main Article Needed	

Includes 	Eritrea (British Administration);
		Eritrea (British Military Administration);
		Malaya (British Military Administration);
		North Borneo (British Military Administration);
		Sarawak (British Military Administration);
		Somalia (British Administration);
		Somalia (British Military Administration);
		Tripolitania (British Administration);
		Tripolitania (British Military Administration)

See also 	British Occupation Issues;
		British Occupation of Italian Colonies;
		East Africa Forces;
		Egypt (British Forces);
		Middle East Forces

BA Eritrea 

Refer 	Eritrea (British Administration)

BA Somalia 

Refer 	Somalia (British Administration)

BA Tripolitania 

Refer 	Tripolitania (British Administration)

Baden 

Became part of Germany in 1871.

Dates 	1851–1871
Capital 	Karlsruhe
Currency 	60 kreuzer = 1 gulden

Main Article  Postage stamps and postal history of Baden

Baden (French Zone) 

Dates 	1947–1949
Currency 	(1947) 100 pfennige = 1 Reichsmark
		(1948) 100 pfennige = 1 DM

Refer 	Germany (Allied Occupation)

Baghdad (British Occupation) 

British occupation forces issued Turkish stamps overprinted BAGHDAD IN BRITISH OCCUPATION.

Dates 	1917 only
Currency 	12 pies = 1 anna; 16 annas = 1 rupee

Refer 	British Occupation Issues

Bahamas 

Self-government was introduced on January 7, 1964.  The islands became an independent member of the Commonwealth of Nations on July 10, 1973.

Dates 	1859 –
Capital 	Nassau
Currency 	(1859) 12 pence = 1 shilling; 20 shillings = 1 pound
		(1966) 100 cents = 1 dollar

Main article  Postage stamps and postal history of the Bahamas

Bahawalpur 

Pakistan stamps in use since 1949.

Dates 	1945–1949
Capital 	Bahawalpur
Currency 	12 pies = 1 anna; 16 annas = 1 rupee

Main Article
Postage stamps and postal history of Bahawalpur

Bahrain 

A group of islands 20 miles east of the Arabian peninsula and joined to Saudi Arabia by causeway.
The largest is Bahrain itself.  The site has been inhabited for over 5000 years.  Bahrain was
under British protection 1861–1971 and is now fully independent.  Indian and British postal
administration was used until 1 January 1966 when Bahrain opened its own service.

Bahrain used Indian stamps 1883–1933.  Since then it has had its own stamps but also used
general issues of British PAs in Eastern Arabia during shortages in the 1950s.

Issues during 1933–1947 were Indian stamps overprinted BAHRAIN.  During 1948–59 British stamps were used, again overprinted BAHRAIN.  The first stamps exclusive to Bahrain were issued on 1 July 1960.

Dates 	1933 –
Capital  	Manama
Currency  	(1933) 12 pies = 1 anna; 16 annas = 1 rupee
		(1957) 100 naye paise = 1 rupee
		(1966) 100 fils = 1 dinar

Main Article
Postage stamps and postal history of Bahrain	

See also 	British Postal Agencies in Eastern Arabia

Baluchistan 

Refer 	Las Bela

Bamra 

Dates 	1888–1890
Currency 	12 pies = 1 anna; 16 annas = 1 rupee

Refer 	Indian Native States

Banat Bacska (Romanian Occupation) 

Romanian occupation of Hungary.  The area was subsequently split between Romania and
Yugoslavia.

Dates 	1919–1920
Capital 	Temesvar (Timișoara)
Currency 	100 filler = 1 korona

Refer 	Romanian Post Abroad

Bangkok (British Post Office) 

British PO issued 1867 Straits Settlements stamps with an overprint of B.

Dates 	1882–1885
Currency 	100 cents = 1 dollar

Refer 	British Post Offices Abroad

Bangladesh 

Formerly East Pakistan.

Dates 	1971 –
Capital 	Dhaka
Currency 	(1971) 100 paisa = 1 rupee
		(1972) 100 paisa = 1 taka

Main Article 	Postage stamps and postal history of Bangladesh

Baranya (Serbian Occupation) 

Serbian occupation of Hungary.

Dates 	1919 only
Capital 	Pécs
Currency 	100 filler = 1 korona

Refer 	Serbian Occupation Issues

Barbados 

Self-government was attained on 16 October 1961.  Became an independent member of the Commonwealth of Nations on 30 November 1966.

Dates 	1852 –
Capital 	Bridgetown
Currency  	(1852) 12 pence = 1 shilling; 20 shillings = 1 pound
		(1950) 100 cents = 1 dollar

Main Article 	Postage stamps and postal history of Barbados

Barbuda 

Barbuda is one of the islands making up the state of Antigua and Barbuda.  It had a separate issue in 1922 of overprinted Leeward Islands stamps (11 values).  Apart from this, it used stamps of Antigua and Leeward Islands concurrently until 1968.  During 1971–1973, Antigua stamps were in sole use.  Barbuda has had its own stamps on a regular basis 1968–1971 and since 1973.  Barbuda stamps are valid in Antigua and vice versa.

Dates 	1922 –
Capital 	Codrington
Currency  	(1922) 12 pence = 1 shilling; 20 shillings = 1 pound
		(1968) 100 cents = 1 dollar

Refer 	Antigua and Barbuda

Main article  Postage stamps and postal history of Barbuda

Barwani 

Dates 	1921–1938
Currency  	12 pies = 1 anna; 16 annas = 1 rupee

Refer 	Indian Native States

Bashahr 

Refer 	Bussahir

Basle 

Swiss Cantonal Administration issue on 1 July 1845 was of one stamp only.  This was valued
at 21/2 rappen and inscribed STADT POST BASEL.

Dates 	1845 only
Currency 	100 rappen = 1 franken

Refer 	Swiss Cantonal Issues

Basutoland 

Used Cape of Good Hope stamps 1880–1933 and became Lesotho in 1966.

Dates 	1933–1966
Capital 	Maseru
Currency 	(1933) 12 pence = 1 shilling; 20 shillings = 1 pound
		(1961) 100 cents = 1 rand

Main Article Needed	

See also 	Lesotho

Batum (British Occupation) 

Batum is a Georgian Black Sea port which had been captured by Turkey in April 1918.  It was occupied by British forces December 1918 to 6 July 1920 when it was included in the Republic of Georgia.

Separate stamps were issued by Batum in 1919.  In addition, several issues of both these and Russian types were overprinted BRITISH OCCUPATION.

Dates 	1919–1920
Currency 	100 kopecks = 1 Georgian rouble

Refer 	British Occupation Issues

Bavaria 

Stamps are inscribed BAYERN.

Dates 	1849–1920
Capital 	Munich
Currency  	(1849) 60 kreuzer = 1 gulden
		(1874) 100 pfennige = 1 mark

Main Article Needed

Bechuanaland 

Previously Bechuanaland Protectorate; now Botswana.

Dates 	1965–1966
Capital 	Mafeking
Currency 	100 cents = 1 rand

Refer 	Bechuanaland Protectorate

Bechuanaland Protectorate 

The territory north of the Molopo river which became Botswana in 1966.

The first issues 1888–1889 were overprinted Great Britain, British Bechuanaland and Cape of Good Hope types.  During 1890–1897, British Bechuanaland stamps were used.  From October 1897, overprinted Great Britain were used until 12 December 1932 when specific stamps for the Protectorate were first issued.

Dates 	1888–1965
Capital 	Mafeking
Currency  	(1888) 12 pence = 1 shilling; 20 shillings = 1 pound
		(1961) 100 cents = 1 rand

Includes 	Bechuanaland

Main article  Postage stamps and postal history of Bechuanaland Protectorate

See also 	Botswana;
		British Bechuanaland;
		Cape of Good Hope

Beirut 

Stamps were issued by British, French and Russian post offices.  The British office was open 1873–1914: one issue of 1906 was particular to this office which normally issued British Levant.  The French office was open 1840–1914: one issue of 1905 was particular to the office which otherwise issued French stamps (to 1885) or French Levant (1885–1914).  The Russian office was open 1857–1914: particular stamps issued in 1879 and 1909–10; normally used Russia or Russian Levant.

Other offices were opened by Austria, Egypt, Germany and Italy.  The German office was open 1900–14 and used German Levant.  The Italian office was open 1873–83 and used the ESTERO overprints.  The Austrian office used Austrian Levant and the Egyptian office used Egypt.

Refer 	Beirut (British Post Office);
		Beirut (French Post Office);
		Beirut (Russian Post Office)

See also 	Austro–Hungarian Post Offices in the Turkish Empire;
		British Post Offices in the Turkish Empire;
		Egyptian Post Offices in the Turkish Empire;
		French Post Offices in the Turkish Empire;
		German Post Offices in the Turkish Empire;
		Italian Post Offices in the Turkish Empire;
		Russian Post Offices in the Turkish Empire

Beirut (British Post Office) 

The office was open 1873–1914 and normally used stamps of British Levant.  One issue on 2 July 1906 was particular to Beirut.  This consisted of one stamp with an overprint of 1 Piastre, the
stamp used being the twopence Edward VII definitive (green and carmine) that was first issued
in Britain during September 1905.

Dates 	1906 only
Currency 	40 paras = 1 piastre

Refer 	British Post Offices in the Turkish Empire

Beirut (French Post Office) 

The office was open 1840–1914 and normally used stamps of France (to 1885) or French Levant
(1885–1914).  One issue of 17 January 1905 was particular to Beirut.  This consisted of a
single French stamp overprinted by 1 Piastre Beyrouth.

Dates 	1905 only
Currency 	40 paras = 1 piastre

Refer 	French Post Offices in the Turkish Empire

Beirut (Russian Post Office) 

The office was open 1857–1914 and normally used stamps of Russia or Russian Levant.  Occasional
issues in 1879 and again in 1909–10 were particular to Beirut.  These were Russian Levant types
overprinted by Beyrouth and a value.

Dates 	1879–1910
Currency 	40 paras = 1 piastre

Refer 	Russian Post Offices in the Turkish Empire

Belarus 

Formerly part of the Russian Empire and the USSR, Belarus became independent in 1991 and began
its own postal administration in 1992.

It has previously been called Byelorussia or Byelorussian Soviet Socialist Republic.

Dates 	1992 –
Capital 	Minsk
Currency 	100 kopecks = 1 Belarusian rubel

Main Article 	Postage stamps and postal history of Belarus	

See also 	Union of Soviet Socialist Republics (USSR)

References

Bibliography
 Stanley Gibbons Ltd, Europe and Colonies 1970, Stanley Gibbons Ltd, 1969
 Stanley Gibbons Ltd, various catalogues
 Stuart Rossiter & John Flower, The Stamp Atlas, W H Smith, 1989
 XLCR Stamp Finder and Collector's Dictionary, Thomas Cliffe Ltd, c.1960

External links
 AskPhil – Glossary of Stamp Collecting Terms
 Encyclopaedia of Postal History

Ba